The 2013 Tulsa mayoral election was held on June 11, 2013 to elect the mayor of Tulsa, Oklahoma. No candidate received a majority vote in the primary elections, and the top two finishers advanced to a runoff election on November 12, 2013. Incumbent mayor Dewey F. Bartlett Jr. was re-elected to a second term after facing former mayor Kathy Taylor.

This was the first mayoral election in Tulsa to use a nonpartisan two-round system rather than partisan primary system. Candidates' party affiliations did not appear on the ballot.

General election

Candidates

Advanced to runoff 
 Dewey F. Bartlett Jr. (Republican), incumbent mayor since 2009
 Kathy Taylor (Democratic), former mayor (2006–2009)

Eliminated in primary 
 Jerry DeWayne Branch (Independent)
 Bill Christiansen (Republican), former city councilor
 Lawrence Kirkpatrick (Independent), perennial candidate

Results

Runoff

Results

References 

Tulsa
Tulsa
2013